Defending champions Sam Schröder and Niels Vink defeated Robert Shaw and David Wagner in the final, 6–1, 6–2 to win the quad doubles wheelchair tennis title at the 2022 US Open.

Seeds

Draw

Finals

References

External links 
 Draw

Wheelchair quad doubles
U.S. Open, 2022 Quad doubles